The Canadian French-language television mystery music game show Qui sait chanter? premiered the second season on Noovo on 19 September 2022, following a Wild West special that aired on 12 September 2022.

Gameplay

Format
Under the original format, the contestant can eliminate one or two mystery singers after each round. The game concludes with the last mystery singer standing which depends on the outcome of a duet performance with a guest artist.

Rewards
The contestant must eliminate one mystery singer at the end of each round, receiving  if they eliminate a bad singer. If the singer is bad, the contestant's winnings is given to the bad singer instead.

Rounds

Each episode presents the guest artist and contestant with six people whose identities and singing voices are kept concealed until they are eliminated to perform on the "stage of truth" or remain in the end to perform the final duet.

Episodes

Guest artists

Panelists

Notes

References

Qui sait chanter?
2022 Canadian television seasons